Wanna Be a Star is the ninth album by the Canadian rock band Chilliwack, released in September 1981.  At this point, the band had collapsed into a trio, without a full-time drummer, but leader Bill Henderson and guitarist/keyboardist/drummer Brian MacLeod had become a powerful songwriting team during the interim.  The single release "My Girl (Gone, Gone, Gone)"  became the group's first hit since the 1979 collapse of their former label Mushroom Records, reaching #1 in Canada and giving Chilliwack their U.S. Top 40 breakthrough peaking at #22 on the Billboard Hot 100: "My Girl (Gone, Gone, Gone)" also gave Chilliwack their only evident chart item outside North America reaching #57 in Australia with a disproportionately long chart run of 28 weeks. The success of "My Girl (Gone, Gone, Gone)" led to a touring version of Chilliwack re-forming. The album's second single: "I Believe", released in early 1982, was also a Top 10 Canadian hit and returned Chilliwack to the U.S. Top 40 at #33. In November 1982, Wanna Be a Star was certified Platinum (in excess of 100,000 copies sold) in Canada.

Overall the album is something of a concept album about the "rock and roll" lifestyle and the pursuit of fame. The leadoff track "Sign Here" is a reference to Chilliwack's new quest for mainstream success, tempered by their brush with fame on Mushroom.  This was the first album they recorded with Solid Gold Records in Canada, a new Toronto-based label.

Track listing

"Sign Here" (Bill Henderson/Brian MacLeod) (2:57) 
"So You Wanna Be a Star" (Henderson/MacLeod) (4:29) 
"Tell It to the Telephone" (Henderson) (3:14)
"Too Many Enemies" (Henderson/MacLeod) (4:39) 
"Living In Stereo" (4:49) (Henderson)
"Mr. Rock" (3:51) (Henderson)
"My Girl (Gone, Gone, Gone)" (Henderson/MacLeod) (4:16) 
"(Don't Wanna) Live for a Living" (MacLeod) (3:22)
"Walk On" (Henderson) (3:38)
"I Believe" (Henderson) (3:57)

Musicians

Bill Henderson - vocals, guitars, keyboards
Brian MacLeod - vocals, drums, guitars, keyboards
Ab Bryant - bass

References

1981 albums
Chilliwack (band) albums